The European School, Culham (ESC) was one of the fourteen European Schools and the only one in the United Kingdom. Located in Culham near Abingdon in Oxfordshire. It was founded in 1978 for the purpose of providing an education to the children of staff working for the European Atomic Energy Community (Euratom).

History
The European School, Culham was founded in 1978 for the purpose of providing an education to the children of staff working for the European Atomic Energy Community (Euratom) on the Joint European Torus (JET) fusion energy research programme based nearby, and later, additionally, children of staff seconded as part of the European Fusion Development Agreement (EFDA).

With the relocation of European Union-seconded researchers and their families following the formation of JET's successor in France, the International Thermonuclear Experimental Reactor (ITER), and the formation of EFDA's successor, EUROfusion, to support ITER's development, it was announced that the school would close on 31 August 2017. The school confirmed that this was a move unrelated to Brexit. The final two employees, the bursar and accountant, continued to work until 31 May 2018.

The former ESC campus was subsumed by the Europa School UK on 1 September 2017. ESUK is a 'free school' and an Accredited European School with all students following a learning programme leading to the European Baccalaureate qualification. Accredited European Schools are schools under national jurisdiction within European Union (EU) member states which, without forming part of the intergovernmental network of European Schools, offer its multilingual curriculum and the European Baccalaureate.

Notable alumni 
 Henry Brett, England polo player
 Tommaso Allan, Italian rugby union player

Notable former staff 
 Tom Høyem, school Director (1987-1994)
 Marcus Stock, former teacher of Religious Education. Now Bishop of Leeds.
 Colin Hannaford, former mathematics teacher.

See also 
Europa School UK
European School
European Schools

References

Further reading

External links 
 
 How Your School Compares Internationally: PISA-based Test for Schools Pilot Trial, OECD, 2012
 The European Baccalaureate – An Overview, Department for Education, 2016

Culham
Defunct schools in Oxfordshire
International schools in the United Kingdom
Educational institutions established in 1978
1978 establishments in England
Educational institutions disestablished in 2017
2017 disestablishments in England